Batesville is an unincorporated community in Greenville County, in the U.S. state of South Carolina.

History
The community was named after William Bates, the original owner of the town site. A post office called Batesville was established in 1890, and remained in operation until 1907.

In 1925, Batesville had 150 inhabitants.

References

Unincorporated communities in South Carolina
Unincorporated communities in Greenville County, South Carolina